Homosexual is the fifth studio album by Australian singer-songwriter Darren Hayes. It was released on 7 October 2022 and is Hayes' third studio album to be released on his own record label, Powdered Sugar. The album was preceded by four singles: "Let's Try Being in Love", "Do You Remember?", "Poison Blood", and "All You Pretty Things". Homosexual is the first of Hayes' studio albums where he has written, composed, produced and performed entirely by himself.

Background
On 26 January 2022, Hayes released a new single, "Let's Try Being in Love". "I wanted to show I love the feminine in me, be proud of the gay me. There's a dance scene that is so passionate, everything's alive and thriving and blooming. That's how I feel in general about music. And that's a hugely sharp contrast to how I felt 10 years ago." On naming the album Homosexual, Hayes told Attitude magazine: "The most obvious [reason] is that I'm a gay man who grew up in an era when that word was used to shame and vilify people like me, so I wanted to reclaim it [...] In 2022 I'm living in a time and in a country where the freedoms of LGBTQI+ people are more at risk than they've ever been. 

Hayes told Music Feeds "My new album was born from a desire to rid myself of the grief I developed over the years I lost to shame growing up in a world where being gay was met with rejection and condemnation. I wanted to revisit my teenage years with the wisdom of a proud 50-year-old gay man and revisit my youthful memories and view them through this new peach-tinted lens of joy." He went on to say "The production on my album is deeply inspired by 1985 to 1987, memories of listening to the 12-inch extended mixes of my favourite Madonna or George Michael songs.

Singles
 The lead single from the album was "Let's Try Being in Love", which was released on 27 January 2022. The official music video stars Scott Evans as Hayes' lover. The video was directed by Andrew Putschoegl. In the United Kingdom, "Let's Try Being in Love" debuted and peaked at number 96 on the Official UK Singles Download Chart Top 100 and peaked at number 9 on the Australian Independent chart.

 "Do You Remember?" was released as the second single on 11 March 2022. The music video premiered on 17 March 2022 and was directed by Hayes and Madeleine Coghlan.

 On 6 June 2022, Hayes released "Poison Blood", which details his life living with depression, and others affected by it. Hayes released the official "Poison Blood" music video on 26 June 2022, announcing UK Tour dates on the same day. The video was directed by Alex Hyner and premiered online on 26 June 2022.

 "All You Pretty Things" was released as the fourth single on 19 August 2022 and was the final single before the parent album's release. Hayes dedicated the track to the memory of the victims of the 2016 Pulse nightclub shooting. The video was released on 30 September 2022 and opened with the message "To those we lost at Pulse".

Critical reception

Giselle Au-Nhien Nguyen, reviewing the album for The Sydney Morning Herald, gave the album three-and-a-half stars and wrote that "there's something thrilling about hearing a musician who’s been a mainstay in Australian pop for so long go his own way, with little care for others' expectations. There's a real sense of hard-won independence on this record, a sense of personal liberation." The Independent gave the LP 5/5 stars, calling it a "proud and simple reclamation". Billboard opined Hayes "employs the blissful, gay-club-adjacent dance-pop of the early aughts to dissect his own trauma [...] It’s neither happy nor sad — it’s honest." Entertainment Focus rated the album 4/5 stars and called it a “triumph”, adding that Hayes “deserve[d] to be held high among the best pop artists in the music industry”. Metro Weekly rated Homosexual 4/5 stars, praising the "celebration of identity and freedom", adding that the album "feels like Darren Hayes [is] at his most free and unencumbered as an artist."

Chart performance
Homosexual debuted at number 16 on the Australian Artist Albums Chart.

On 10 October 2022, Homosexual placed at number 19 on the midweek UK Albums Chart; this would have been Hayes' highest UK album entry since This Delicate Thing We've Made peaked at number 14 in 2007, and his fourth studio album to reach the top 20. However, when the UK Albums Chart was released on 14 October 2022, Homosexual debuted at number 82, as well as at number 3 on the UK Album Downloads Chart and number 13 on the UK Album Sales Chart.

On 10 February 2023, the vinyl issue of the album was released. In the UK, this saw Homosexual chart at number 60 on the UK Album Sales chart.

Tour
On 2 March 2022, Hayes announced the "Do You Remember?" Tour that would be performed in six Australian cities between January and February 2023 and would feature songs from his musical career as part of Savage Garden and as a solo artist. On 26 June 2022, Hayes announced UK tour dates, also for 2023. On 7 October, Hayes announced a North American leg of the "Do You Remember?" Tour, consisting of dates in Toronto, New York and Los Angeles.

Track listing 
All tracks written, produced, composed and performed by Darren Hayes.

Charts

Release history

References

2022 albums
Darren Hayes albums
LGBT-related albums